Karen Berg (born December 30, 1961) is a physician and professor who also serves in the Kentucky State Senate, representing the 26th District. She was elected to the Kentucky Senate (26th district) as a Democrat in a special election held on June 23, 2020, defeating Bill Ferko. She succeeded Senator Ernie Harris, who resigned on April 15, 2020. She is the only Jewish member of the Kentucky State Senate.

Early life 
Berg is a graduate of Central High School in Louisville, Kentucky, the University of Kentucky where she earned her Bachelor of Arts, and the University of Louisville, where she earned a Doctor of Medicine in 1987.

She is the daughter of Harold Berg, a physician and artist.

Career 
Berg is a diagnostic radiologist.

Berg ran for the Kentucky State Senate in 2018, losing the seat to incumbent Ernie Harris. She won the seat in a special election in June 2020 after Harris announced his retirement. This was the first time in 25 years that the seat was won by a Democrat. She is the only Jewish member serving on the Kentucky State Senate.

She supports Kentucky Governor Andy Beshear’s efforts to reinstate Kentucky's health insurance exchange, a program that was abandoned by previous Republican governor Matt Bevin.

She is also an assistant professor in the Department of Radiology at the University of Louisville.

Personal life 
Berg's son, Henry Berg-Brousseau, was a transgender rights advocate and worked as a deputy press secretary for politics of the Human Rights Campaign. In 2015, at 16 years old, he testified against a bathroom bill in the Kentucky state legislature. He died by suicide at the age of 24 on December 16, 2022.

References

External links

Living people
Jewish American people in Kentucky politics
21st-century American politicians
Democratic Party Kentucky state senators
21st-century American women politicians
Jewish women politicians
University of Kentucky alumni
University of Louisville School of Medicine alumni
21st-century American Jews
Women state legislators in Kentucky
21st-century American women physicians
21st-century American physicians
Physicians from Louisville, Kentucky
Jewish physicians
1961 births